The Men's 4 × 100 metres relay event at the 2011 World Championships in Athletics was held at the Daegu Stadium on 4 September.

USA won the first semi-final with deliberate handoffs, setting the world leader.  France followed them into the final.  The second semi-final was won by Trinidad and Tobago, ahead of favored Jamaica.  Saint Kitts and Nevis set their national record in making the time qualifier in third.  The third semi-final was much closer as Great Britain led Poland, with Italy making the final time qualifier.

In the final, Nesta Carter put Jamaica out into the lead, but Justin Gatlin ran down Michael Frater to put the USA even with Jamaica.  On the third leg, Yohan Blake again edged Jamaica into the lead.  Going into the final handoff, Darvis Patton of USA clipped Britain's Harry Aikines-Aryeetey and fell into a forward roll. American anchor Walter Dix never saw the baton and the British team also did not finish the race. In addition, Patton's fall seriously impeded Richard Thompson, Trinidad and Tobago's anchor, which caused his team to finish last.
Meanwhile Usain Bolt took the baton and pulled away.  Jamaica bettered their own World Record to finish in a time of 37.04.
It was the only world record to be set at the championships.  France finished second with Saint Kitts and Nevis third.

Medalists

Records 
Prior to the competition, the established records were as follows.

Schedule

Results

Heats 
Qualification: First 2 of each heat (Q) plus the 2 fastest times (q) advance to the final.

Final 

* Trinidad and Tobago's Aaron Armstrong tripped over USA's falling Darvis Patton, causing them to finish last.

References

External links 
 Relay results at the IAAF website

Relay 4 x 100
Relays at the World Athletics Championships
4 × 100 metres relay